Andrija Mohorovičić (pennant number BŠ-72) is a  hydrographic survey ship used as a training vessel by the Croatian Navy ( – HRM). The ship was built by the Gdańsk Shipyard in 1971 for use by the Hydrographic Institute of the Yugoslav Navy. At the start of the Croatian War of Independence, the ship was captured by Croatian forces and commissioned in the HRM in 1993.

Since then, the ship has been used as a training ship and a patrol boat of the Croatian Coast Guard. In 2015 Andrija Mohorovovičić deployed to southern Italy to participate in Operation Triton, rescuing immigrants attempting to cross the Mediterranean Sea into the European Union. The ship returned to Croatia after three months, rescuing over 2,500 immigrants during the course of its deployment

Design and building 
Andrija Mohorovičić was built in 1971 at the Gdańsk Shipyard in what was then the Polish People's Republic. The crew numbers 27 members, four of which are officers. Its sole armament consists of two single-barreled  guns. The ship is also equipped with a crane and a launch.

Service history 
Andrija Mohorovičić was commissioned in the Yugoslav Navy on 10 September 1972, and was assigned to the Navy's Hydrographic Institute under the command of Đuro Pojer. The outbreak of the Croatian War of Independence, however, led to the ship being captured by Croatian forces in September 1991. Work on the conversion was completed by late 1993 and the ship was commissioned in the Croatian Navy in January 1994 with Renato Žarković as its first commander in Croatian service.

See also 
List of active Croatian Navy ships
List of ships of the Yugoslav Navy

Notes

References 

1971 ships
Ships built in Gdańsk
Ships of the Yugoslav Navy
Ships of the Croatian Navy
Naval ships built in Poland for export
Poland–Yugoslavia relations